Šahbaz Džihanović (born 13 June 1949) was one of the two Vice Presidents of the Federation of Bosnia and Herzegovina from 27 January 2003 to 22 February 2007.

References

Living people
Bosniaks of Bosnia and Herzegovina
Vice Presidents of the Federation of Bosnia and Herzegovina
Politicians of the Federation of Bosnia and Herzegovina
1949 births